Vos Iz Neias? (Yiddish: "What's New?") also called "VIN News" is an online news site that caters to the Orthodox Jewish and Hasidic communities in the United States. Its coverage is primarily focused on the New York metropolitan area and Israel. Vos Iz Neias and its competitors, Matzav, and Yeshiva World News, are sources of online news for American Orthodox Jews.

Vos Iz Neias is owned by four anonymous Orthodox Jewish investors. The site has become a source for the mainstream media as well, and has been quoted in The New York Times, Daily News, Miami Herald and the New York Post.

There are advertisers and writers, but since all business is conducted through the internet and through PayPal, the anonymity of the investors are maintained.

In 2020, Vos Iz Neias endorsed Donald Trump due to his support of school vouchers and position on Israel.

References

External links
 Vos Iz Neias?

Blogs about Jews and Judaism
Jewish websites